Cemetery Dance Publications is an American specialty press publisher of horror and dark suspense.  Cemetery Dance was founded by Richard Chizmar, a horror author, while he was in college.  It is associated with Cemetery Dance magazine, which was founded in 1988.  They began to publish books in 1992. They later expanded to encompass a magazine and website featuring news, interviews, and reviews related to horror literature.

Cemetery Dance Publications is best known for their high quality hardcover releases.  These are usually available as collectible autographed limited editions and lettered editions.

Awards
 Richard Chizmar won the 1999 World Fantasy Award for Cemetery Dance Publications (the magazine won in 1990 and 1992). It was also nominated for the same award in 1993 and again in 1998.
 Dark Harvest by Norman Partridge won the 2006 Bram Stoker Award for Best Long Fiction, has been nominated for the 2007 World Fantasy Award, and it was named one of the 2006 "Best Books of the Year" by Publishers Weekly.
Basic Black: Tales of Appropriate Fear by Terry Dowling was an Honourable Mention for the 2006 Australian Shadows Award (hosted by the Australian Horror Writers Association).

Bram Stoker Award nominations and wins
2006 Bram Stoker Award Winners:
Long Fiction:  Dark Harvest by Norman Partridge
Short Fiction:  "Tested" by Lisa Morton, in CD #55
Fiction Collection:  Destinations Unknown by Gary A. Braunbeck
Anthology:  Mondo Zombie edited by John Skipp

2004 Bram Stoker Award Nominees:
First Novel: Black Fire by James Kidman
Short Fiction: "A Madness of Starlings" by Douglas Clegg in CD #50
Fiction Collection: The Machinery of Night by Douglas Clegg
Anthology: Shivers III edited by Richard Chizmar
Non-Fiction: The Road to the Dark Tower by Bev Vincent

2004 Bram Stoker Award Winner:
Fiction Collection: Fearful Symmetries by Thomas F. Monteleone

2003 Bram Stoker Award Nominees:
Long Fiction: The Necromancer by Douglas Clegg
Long Fiction: Roll Them Bones by David Niall Wilson

2002 Bram Stoker Award Nominees:
Novel: From a Buick 8 by Stephen King
Fiction Collection: Knuckles and Tales by Nancy A. Collins
Anthology: Shivers edited by Richard Chizmar

2001 Bram Stoker Award Nominees:
Anthology: Trick or Treat: A Collection of Halloween Novellas edited by Richard Chizmar

2001 Bram Stoker Award Winner:
Alternative Forms:  Dark Dreamers: Facing the Masters of Fear by Beth Gwinn & Stanley Wiater

2000 Bram Stoker Award Nominees:
Anthology: Bad News edited by Richard Laymon
Short Fiction: Jack Ketchum's "Gone" (published in the anthology October Dreams)

2000 Bram Stoker Award Winner:
Novel: The Traveling Vampire Show by Richard Laymon

1999 Bram Stoker Award Nominees:
Long Fiction: Right to Life by Jack Ketchum

1999 Bram Stoker Award Winner:
Anthology: 999: New Stories of Horror and Suspense edited by Al Sarrantonio

1998 Bram Stoker Award Nominees:
Anthology: Robert Bloch's Psychos edited by Robert Bloch and Martin H. Greenberg
Anthology: Best of Cemetery Dance edited by Richard Chizmar

1997 Bram Stoker Award Nominees:
Fiction Collection: Things Left Behind by Gary A. Braunbeck

1994 Bram Stoker Award Winners:
Short Fiction: "The Box" by Jack Ketchum in CD #20
Fiction Collection: Writer of the Purple Rage by Joe R. Lansdale

Selected list of books published by Cemetery Dance Publications

It: The 25th Anniversary Edition (signed limited edition) by Stephen King (December, 2011)
Gwendy's Button Box by Stephen King and Richard Chizmar ( novella first published by Cemetery Dance Publications) (May, 2017)
Full Dark, No Stars (signed limited edition) by Stephen King (December, 2010)
Blockade Billy by Stephen King (an original novella first printed by Cemetery Dance Publications) (April, 2010) 
The Secretary of Dreams: Volume 1 (and Volume 2) by Stephen King and illustrated by Glenn Chadbourne (2006)  (Volume II'''s )From a Buick 8 (signed limited edition) by Stephen King (2002) The Dark Man: An Illustrated Poem by Stephen King and illustrated by Glenn Chadbourne (2013) Robert Bloch's Psychos, edited by Robert Bloch & Martin H. Greenberg (1997) October Dreams: A Celebration of Halloween, edited by Richard Chizmar with Robert Morrish (2000) Blue November Storms, by Brian Freeman (2005) Strange Highways, by Dean Koontz (1995) Fear Nothing, by Dean Koontz (1997) Seize the Night, by Dean Koontz (1998) False Memory, by Dean Koontz (1999) Mucho Mojo signed limited edition by Joe R. Lansdale (1994) Act of love signed limited edition by Joe R. Lansdale (1981) Writer of the Purple Rage short story collection by Joe R. Lansdale (1994) Nothing Lasting'' E-book by Glen Krisch

Selected list of published authors

Clive Barker
Charles Beaumont
William Peter Blatty
Max Booth III
Ray Bradbury
Kealan Patrick Burke
Poppy Z. Brite
Lincoln Child
Richard Chizmar
Simon Clark
Douglas Clegg
Justin Cronin
Frank Darabont
Dennis Etchison
Gillian Flynn
Brian Freeman
Mick Garris
Ray Garton
Christopher Golden
J. F. Gonzalez
Ed Gorman
Rick Hautala
Joe Hill (writer)
Brian Hodge
Brian Keene
Ronald Kelly
Jack Ketchum
Stephen King
Dean Koontz
Michael Koryta
Joe R. Lansdale
Richard Laymon
Tim Lebbon
Edward Lee
Bentley Little
John R. Little
Graham Masterton
Richard Matheson
Brett McBean
Robert McCammon
Thomas F. Monteleone
William F. Nolan
James A. Moore
Norman Partridge
John Pelan
Douglas Preston
Bill Pronzini
Anne Rice
Al Sarrantonio
Michael Slade
Peter Straub
Thomas Tessier
Bill Walker
F. Paul Wilson
T. M. Wright

References

External links
 

Small press publishing companies
Horror book publishing companies
Publishing companies established in 1988